is a Japanese manga series written and illustrated by Tsurun Hatomune. It was serialized in Shueisha's Weekly Shōnen Jump magazine from September 2019 to August 2020, and collected into five tankōbon volumes.

Plot
Rena Haze is a high school student in Tokyo who is able to see spirits and has a line of about 100 following her around everywhere she goes. Mitama decides to move in next door to Rena and vows to protect her from spirits, but it turns out he is afraid of ghosts.

Characters

A Secureity professional, who despite being one of the best at his job of exorcising spirits, is afraid of them. When he cries, his psychic powers increase and he is able to overcome his fear. Despite his abysmal work as an exorcist, he is a very skilled basketball player and cook.

A first-year high school student, Rena has naturally attracted spirits since she was born and currently has about 100 with her at all times. The spirits that follow her, and whom she gives names to, are typically friendly and help her with various tasks. Although she lives with her mother, Rena is usually alone due to her mother's long work hours.

A Secureity agent who attended its Treining Institute with Mitama. Despite being a Secureity professional and graduating at the top of his class, Soya has no spirit sense and is unable to see them. He worked a desk job at headquarters until being dispatched when Mitama reported on Rena and her 100 spirits. Like Mitama, Soya moves in next door to Rena.

A collector of rare and powerful spirits that he then uses in battle. He often punctuates his phrases with "jan k'now?" After unsuccessfully trying several times to capture Rena's spirits, he realizes the error of his ways and moves next door to Rena as well in hope of learning how to peacefully bond with spirits under her tutorship.

Publication
Mitama Security: Spirit Busters is written and illustrated by Tsurun Hatomune. It started in the 2019 40th issue of Shueisha's Weekly Shōnen Jump, published on September 2, 2019. The series finished in the 2020 combined 36th-37th issue of Weekly Shōnen Jump, published on August 11, 2020. A spinoff chapter was published on Shōnen Jump+ on August 31, 2020. Shueisha has compiled its chapters into five individual tankōbon volumes, released from February 4 to October 2, 2020.

The manga is digitally published in English by Viz Media on its Shonen Jump website and the Manga Plus platform. Viz Media will release its volumes digitally, releasing all volumes on December 28, 2021.

Volume list

Reception
In 2020, Mitama Security: Spirit Busters was nominated for the 6th Next Manga Awards and placed 13th out of the 50 nominees with 11,686 votes. Jacob Buchalter of Comic Book Resources praised the series for great visual gags and "pretty good" art, but said the humor is stuff that has been seen before and "there's only so many times a guy can get scared of ghosts." Real Sounds Reiichi Narima described Mitama Security as an occult gag comedy, where all of the characters get more interesting as the series goes on.

References

External links
 Mitama Security: Spirit Busters on the Official Shueisha website 
 Mitama Security: Spirit Busters on Manga Plus
 Mitama Security: Spirit Busters on the Official Viz website
 

Action anime and manga
Comedy anime and manga
Shōnen manga
Shueisha manga
Supernatural anime and manga
Viz Media manga